Petar Omčikus, Sušak, 6 October 1926 – 26 April 2019) was a Serbian painter and member of the Serbian Academy of Sciences and Arts, who lived and worked in Paris, France.

Biography
Since 1937, Omčikus lived in Belgrade. After World War II, he began painting at the Academy of Fine Arts, in class of professor Ivan Tabaković. Together with his wife, painter Kossa Bokchan, left his studies in painting and went to Zadar, which became one of the founders of the Zadar Group, where they are also Mića Popović, Vera Božičković, Bata Mihailović, Ljubinka Jovanovic. After a six-month stay in Zadar, he returned to Belgrade where he joined the Group of Eleven, and his first solo exhibition, hosted in 1951. Shortly, after in 1952, Petar Omčikus and Kossa Bokshan left from Yugoslavia and definitely moved to Paris. Since 1965, they occasionally stayed in Vela Luka on Korčula, where they organized numerous international meetings of artists, philosophers and critics. He participated in numerous group exhibitions at home and abroad.

Art
The beginnings of Omčikus creativity are related to several artists, all from the class of Ivana Tabaković, which is a few months together in Zadar 1947 making the first Yugoslav artistic commune – Zadar Group: Omčikus, his future wife Kossa Bokchan, Mića Popović, Vera Božičković, Bata Mihailović, Ljubinka Jovanović, Mileta Andrejević, Bora Grujić and their friend, student of literature Borislav Mihajlović Mihiz. Rise of the academic nature in the studio for the artists opened up new paths in which are free creativity will, in different ways, to remain during the whole of his creation. Omčikus in the 1951 joins The Group of Eleven who encourages him to continue searching for their own creative paths, then still in the domain of poetic figuration after socialist realism. But the real turning point in his art happened in Paris. Meeting with the abstract art of the time definitely Omčikus directed towards free expression, a move that he is not looking for reality but for individual style. Geometrized associative abstraction of the period but from the beginning of the seventh decade evolved into colorful gestural figuration, which has retained elements of his earlier term. In the later stages of the Omčikus thematisation painting on the portraits, drawings of Belgrade, fantastic realism, and sculpture.

Solo exhibitions (international selection)
1951 Art Gallery ULUS, Belgrade
1955 Galerie Arnaud, Paris
1958 Galerie Jeanne Bucher, Paris
1962 Galerie Formes Contemporaines, Lille
1965 Salon of Moderne Gallery, Belgrade
1972 Grand Palais, Paris
1974 Galleria 'IlGrifo', Rome
1976 Galerie de Seine, Paris
1983 Galerie Plexus, Chexbres (Switzerland)
1985 Galerie des Platanes, Genève
1988 Galerie Plexus, Chexbres (Switzerland)
1989 Museum of contemporary art, retrospective exhibition, Belgrade
1992 Maison de l'UNESCO, Paris
1994 Bibliothèque Universitaire, Nancy
1995 Galerie René Descartes: 'Atelier Dedouvre', Paris
1996 Galerie Plexus: 'Atelier Dedouvre', Chexbres (Switzerland)
1998 Gallery SANU, Belgrade

References (international selection)
Michel Seuphor, Dictionnaire de la peinture abstraite, p.p. 235, Fernand Hazar, Paris, 1957
Luc Menaše, Evropski umetnostno zgodovinski leksikon, p.p. 1526, Mladinska knjiga, Ljubljana, 1971
George Boudaille, Pour un art d'expression. Pierre Omcikous, Les Lettres Françaises, Paris, 3 mai, 1972
Gérald Gassiot Talabot, Omcikous, Opus International No 36, Paris, juin 1972, p.p. 64-65
Anne Tronche, Pierre Omcikous, Opus International No 61-61, Paris, janvier-fevrier 1977, p.p. 108-109
Georges Haldas, Un grand espace pour l'homme à propos de l'oeuvre de Pierre Omcikous, Repères, Genève, No 8, 1984, p.p. 174-179

References

Sources
Documentation Museum of Contemporary Art, Belgrade
Petar Omčikus, monograph, Gallery of Serbian Academy of Sciences and Arts, Belgrade, 1998

1926 births
2019 deaths
Burials at Belgrade New Cemetery
Artists from Rijeka
Artists from Belgrade
Serbs of Croatia
Serbian painters